Theodor Dyring (1 September 1916 – 8 March 1975) was a Norwegian politician for the Centre Party.

He was born in Larvik as a son of bookseller Johan Dyring (1881–1958) and Marie Randers (1879–1966). He graduated from the Norwegian College of Agriculture in 1946, and later studied abroad. He had a career in forestry as well as the Norwegian Home Guard. He had a background in Milorg during World War II. From 1970 to 1975 he was the director of forestry in Vestfold.

In 1963, during the short-lived cabinet Lyng, he was appointed State Secretary in the Ministry of Agriculture. He was elected to the Norwegian Parliament from Vestfold in 1965, and was re-elected on one occasion. During his second term he chaired the Standing Committee on Industry. He was a board member of his regional party chapter from 1965 to 1973. He was also a freemason.

References

1916 births
1975 deaths
Members of the Storting
Centre Party (Norway) politicians
Norwegian state secretaries
Vestfold politicians
People from Larvik
Norwegian foresters
Norwegian College of Agriculture alumni
Norwegian resistance members
20th-century Norwegian politicians